Burmeistera brachyandra is a species of plant in the family Campanulaceae. It is endemic to Ecuador.  Its natural habitats are subtropical or tropical moist lowland forests and subtropical or tropical moist montane forests.

References

Flora of Ecuador
brachyandra
Vulnerable plants
Taxonomy articles created by Polbot
Plants described in 1943